Robert William Ditchburn (14 January 1903 – 8 April 1987) was an English physicist whose career started as Erasmus Smith's Professor of Natural and Experimental Philosophy at Trinity College Dublin (1929-1946), and ended at the University of Reading, where he worked hard to build up the physics department.

Life and career
Ditchburn was born in Waterloo, Lancashire, England, and was educated first at Liverpool University, taking a physics degree there in 1922.  He then went to Trinity College, Cambridge, earning BA (1924) and a PhD (1928) for research done under J. J. Thomson at the Cavendish Laboratory.

He successfully competed for a Fellowship at TCD in 1928, and the following year moved to Ireland to become Erasmus Smith's Professor of Natural and Experimental Philosophy.  In 1930 he was elected a member of the Royal Irish Academy and delivered one of the Donnellan Lectures in 1945. Apart from a few years back in England at the Admiralty Research Laboratory in Teddington during WWII, he remained in Dublin until 1946.  He then became professor and head of the department of physics at Reading University, where he remained until 1968.  While there, he focussed on building up the department, and set up the J.J. Thomson Physical Laboratory.  He authored the book Light (Interscience Publishers, Inc, 1953).  His own research included work on photoionization, the optical properties of solids and the effects of eye movements on visual perception, in particular methods for stabilizing retinal images. In 1962, he became a Fellow of the Royal Society.

He was very active in retirement, both as a consultant for the diamond industry, and working for nuclear disarmament in Pugwash movement. He published the book Eye Movements and Visual Perception (Clarendon Press, 1973) and in 1983 he was awarded the C. E. K. Mees Medal by The Optical Society "for his lengthy career in many disciplines of optics and for his enrichment of optical knowledge". In 1960 he got the Thomas Young Orator Prize.

References

Academics of Trinity College Dublin
Fellows of the Royal Society
Fellows of Trinity College Dublin
Members of the Royal Irish Academy
People from Crosby, Merseyside
British  physicists
British anti–nuclear weapons activists
British mathematicians
People from Carrickmacross
1903 births
1987 deaths